Luke Richardson (born 20 June 1997) is a British professional strongman and powerlifter.

Personal records
In powerlifting competitions:
 Squat raw with knee sleeves: 
 Bench Press: 
 Deadlift: 
 Powerlifting Total 

In strongman competitions:
 18-inch Deadlift: 
 Log press: 
 Hercules Hold: 1m 14.48s  each hand.

In training:
 Deadlift:  for 2 reps with suit and straps
 Axle deadlift:  for 3 reps with suit and straps 
 Log press:

References

1997 births
Living people
English strength athletes
British strength athletes
English sportsmen